The Volvo B9TL is a low-floor double-decker bus built by Volvo from 2002 until 2018. It superseded the Volvo Super Olympian and the Volvo B7TL. The 2-axle version has been superseded by the Volvo B5TL in 2014 and the 3-axle version has been superseded by the Volvo B8L in 2018.

Chassis
The Volvo B9TL chassis shared the same design of the Volvo B7TL. The key difference from both its predecessor, the Volvo Super Olympian and Volvo B7TL, was a new 9.3-litre engine originally designed by Renault. The radiator was located at the rear offside, similar to the smaller B7TL. The front module design was shared with other low-floor bus chassis built by Volvo, and independent suspension is fitted at the front axle (replaced by conventional front suspension after some years of production).

The B9TL was initially offered in three-axle format, and the two-axle variant was added in 2006 to replace the B7TL. The driveline comprises a Volvo D9A Euro III engine (rated at 300 bhp or 340 bhp), which was later replaced by the Volvo D9B Euro IV/V/EEV engine (using selective catalytic reduction technology; two versions were offered - the D9B260 rated at 260 bhp for two-axle version, and a higher powered D9B310, rated at 310 bhp, for three-axle version), and coupled to a ZF 5/6-speed gearbox. Volvo also offered the Voith four-speed gearbox as an alternative gearbox option.

The front wheels of the three-axle B9TL are usually supplied by Alcoa, but some buses (including the three prototypes) had all their wheels supplied by Alcoa.

There were rumours that the Euro III version B9TL that was once planned to being equipped with a German made MAN D2866 series engines with Voith DIWA 864.3E gearbox for Berlin. But since both sides are point out there have Difficulties in Mechanical Configuration, the B9TL version with MAN engine has been completely shelved permanently. This is fully explained that they have originally being expecting for a version to Berlin before they getting the final result that showed fail at the end.

Asia Pacific

Hong Kong

Kowloon Motor Bus

A Volvo B9TL prototype with a Volgren CR223LD body was delivered to Hong Kong in July 2003 for Kowloon Motor Bus (KMB) as a demonstrator for the Eco-Driveline concept. It was put into service in April 2004 and registered as MF5119.

In early 2004, a Volvo B9TL prototype with a facelifted version of the TransBus Enviro500 body arrived in Hong Kong. It had a slightly different front and rear design, and its rear route box was moved beneath the upper deck rear window. After TransBus International was renamed Alexander Dennis in May 2004, it became the only TransBus Enviro-series bus with a non-Dennis chassis.

Later in the same year, a Wright-bodied B9TL prototype was also delivered. The rear design of its Wright body was different from that of the Wright-bodied Volvo Super Olympian, with the number plate moved beneath (and a little to the right of) the rear route box.
In 2005 KMB ordered 63 B9TL chassis with Wright bodywork and 50 with Enviro500 bodies. The Wright-bodied buses entered service between 2005 and 2006, and the Enviro500-bodied buses entered service in late 2006/2007. These were followed by another 35 buses with Enviro500 bodywork, they entered service in 2007/2008.

In 2009, KMB ordered 60 Wright Eclipse Gemini 2 bodied B9TLs, quickly followed by another 115, they have begun delivery as of early 2010. These were followed by an order for a further 115 Wright-bodied B9TLs in 2010. All these buses entered service between 2010 and 2012.

A 10.6-metre 2-axle B9TL was put into service by KMB in 2010. It was equipped with a Volvo D9B-310 engine and a ZF EcoLife 6AP1403B gearbox.

Starting from June 2017, some of the new B9TLs were painted with the new livery of red and silver stripes, with the motto "Heartbeat of the City" shown on the top of the vehicle. The last Wright-bodied 12-metre B9TL was put into service in August 2019.

KMB ordered three Gemilang bodied B9TLs in 2017. They were registered in September 2018 and entered service in March 2019.

As of July 2020, there are 953 Volvo B9TLs in service with KMB.

Long Win Bus
Long Win Bus operates 10 B9TL with Alexander Dennis Enviro500 bodywork which entered service in 2007/2008. All vehicles in this batch are almost identical to those with Kowloon Motor Bus.

Due to a surplus in Long Win's fleet, 8 of them have been transferred to KMB in 2020, while the remaining 2 were transferred as well.

Citybus and New World First Bus

Citybus received one Wright Eclipse Gemini 2-bodied two-axle B9TL (fleet number 7500) on 31 July 2010. This vehicle was first registered in November 2010 and entered service in the following month.

Citybus and New World First Bus placed an order for 51 Wright Eclipse Gemini 2 bodied tri-axle in March 2014, including 50 11.3-metre buses and a 12.8-metre bus for Citybus.  They were assembled by Wrightbus's new partner, Masdef, in Malaysia.

Citybus and New World First Bus placed another order of 65 B9TLs in 2015, including 40 11.3-metre and 25 12-metres buses. All of these have been put into service since 2016.

DBTSL
Discovery Bay Transit Services (DBTSL) from Discovery Bay placed an order of six 12m Wright Eclipse Gemini 2-bodied B9TL in 2014. They are equipped with Volvo D9B-310 engine and ZF Ecolife 6AP1403B gearbox. All vehicles were delivered between June and July 2015. They entered service on 16 August 2015.

MTR Bus
MTR Bus took delivery of 68 11.3-metres Wright Eclipse Gemini 2-bodied B9TLs in 2016/2017. This batch of buses are equipped with Volvo D9B-310 engine and Voith DIWA 864.5 gearbox. They are used to replace the aged Dennis Tridents buses.

Singapore

SBS Transit; Land Transport Authority

SBS Transit of Singapore placed an order for 150 B9TL chassis on 28 December 2004, then the largest single order, which were fitted with bodywork from ComfortDelGro Engineering (CDGE), part of SBS Transit's parent company. An additional order for 50 more chassis was placed in 2006 at a cost of S$29 million soon after putting its first B9TLs into operation, bringing the total fleet size to 200. These buses were delivered by October 2007. They were retrofitted with electronic destination displays in 2011 and 2012. Refurbishment began in 2018, except for one which was written off after being burnt at Ang Mo Kio Bus Depot fire in March 2010. These buses have been repainted into the Lush Green livery as well.

On 13 August 2009, SBS Transit announced an order of 150 Volvo B9TL, with Wright Eclipse Gemini 2 bodies, replacing 55 Leyland Olympian 3-Axles and 8 Volvo Olympian 2-Axles. Those were delivered between 13 September 2010 and 26 August 2011. One of the demonstrator was built by Wrightbus in August 2010, whereas all other buses were bodied by ComfortDelGro Engineering at Hougang.

On 6 September 2010, SBS Transit ordered another 300 Wright-bodied Volvo B9TLs, delivered between 21 September 2011 and 28 December 2012, replacing the rest of Leyland Olympian 3-Axles and 3 Volvo Olympian 3-Axles (Batch 1). 30 buses were delivered as low-entry, while the remaining 270 buses were delivered completely low-floor. In 2012, 30 of the low-floor buses were diverted to the Land Transport Authority's Bus Service Enhancement Programme (BSEP).

On 9 July 2012, SBS Transit ordered another 565 Wright-bodied Volvo B9TLs, delivered between 30 January 2013 and 18 June 2015, to replace most of their older buses, as well as fleet additions and introduction of new bus routes under the BSEP.

SBS Transit's final order of 415 Volvo B9TLs was announced on 1 July 2014, two years before the transition of Singapore's bus industry to the Land Transport Authority's (LTA) Bus Contracting Model in 2016 having only 94 units delivered. The orders for the remaining 321 Volvo B9TLs were subsequently inherited by the LTA for the BCM. An additional 176 Volvo B9TLs were also subsequently ordered by the LTA. The last batch of Volvo B9TLs to be delivered were registered on 27 December 2017.

 Early withdrawal
Between March and April 2021, SBS Transit retired 35 CDGE bodied B9TLs from revenue service due to fleet renewal and were replaced with 35 newer MAN ND323Fs. With the exception of two buses that were relegated to training duties, all of these buses were scrapped between April and July that year.

In January 2022, as part of a framework agreement for the transition of the Downtown Line to New Rail Financial Framework (NRFF) Version 2, 144 of the remaining Volvo B9TL CDGEs were retired from revenue service to be scrapped. These buses are being replaced by surplus buses leased by the Land Transport Authority. As such, only 20 Volvo B9TL CDGEs will continue revenue service until lifespan expiry in 2023.

Australia
Volgren bodied B9TLs were purchased by CDC Melbourne and Thompsons Bus Service.

Europe

United Kingdom

In three-axle form, the B9TL made its debut in the United Kingdom when Weavaway Travel of Newbury placed an order for six B9TL with East Lancs Myllennium Nordic bodywork in late 2004 and put them into service in April/May 2005. Since then, two more were sold to Roadliner of Poole and Provence Private Hire of St Albans for school contracts and commercial work.

The two-axle Volvo B9TL did not make its debut in the United Kingdom until the middle of 2006. The first demonstrator, with Wright Eclipse Gemini body, was delivered to London General in July 2006 for evaluation, it is used on route 11. The first order was secured from Delaine Buses for two examples with the new East Lancs Olympus bodywork. The first one, along with an Alexander Dennis Enviro400-bodied version, were unveiled in "Euro Bus Expo" show in November 2006.

Initial sales of the two-axle version were slow in Britain, particularly in London, after falling foul with the noise and capacity requirements imposed by Transport for London. Eventually orders were also received for the Volvo B9TLs by First London, Go-Ahead London and Metroline. The B9TL had success with Lothian Buses, FirstGroup, East Yorkshire Motor Services, Highland Scottish, Yorkshire Coastliner and Flights Hallmark, Tower Transit where orders were received from 2007 to 2014.

The first order from Arriva was for 10 East Lancs Visionaire open top buses for The Original Tour in January 2007; and delivered in April - November 2007. An additional 16 buses (VXE721 - VXE736) were delivered in October 2011 - February 2012.

It was followed by an order for 16 buses with Darwen Olympus bodywork in high specification featuring leather seats for Arriva Yorkshire entering service between January and May 2008.

London General brought three buses on the Alexander Dennis Enviro 400 bodies for use on route 85. They are now at Sutton Bus Garage, operating on routes 93, 151, 154, and 213.

In Northern Ireland, Translink purchased 125 Volvo B9TLs, all bodied by Wrightbus.

Ireland
Dublin Bus of Dublin, Ireland placed an order for 20 B9TL with single-door Alexander Dennis Enviro500 bodywork in early 2005. These buses were the largest in the fleet and also the first tri-axle double deckers for the Irish capital, the first of them entered service in December 2005. They were withdrawn and sold in December 2018.

In 2007, Dublin Bus ordered 50 B9TL with Alexander Dennis Enviro400 bodywork and another 50 B9TL with Alexander Dennis Enviro500 bodywork for delivery in 2007/2008. The two-axle buses entered service in summer/autumn 2007, and the three-axle buses entered service in December 2007/early 2008. Later Dublin Bus ordered 50 B9TL with Alexander Dennis Enviro400 bodywork and 50 B9TL with Wright Eclipse Gemini bodywork for delivery in 2008/2009. In 2012, Dublin Bus received 80 B9TL with Wright Eclipse Gemini 2 bodywork, but retaining the older Eclipse Gemini front. A further 80 B9TL with Wright Eclipse Gemini 2 bodywork, were received by Dublin Bus in 2013.

Bus Éireann also put 10 Wright Eclipse Gemini-bodied Volvo B9TL into service in late 2008, and a further 10 Wright Eclipse Gemini 2-bodied Volvo B9TL in 2012.

Other European cities

A number of two-axle Volvo B9TL open top buses were sold to a number of cities in Europe for sightseeing purposes.

Successors
The 2-axle Volvo B9TL was replaced by the Volvo B5TL in 2014.  The 3-axle Volvo B9TL was replaced by the Volvo B8L in 2018.

References

External links

B9TL overview and specifications, Volvo Buses Singapore website
B9TL data sheet, Volvo Bus Corporation
D9B engine factsheet, Volvo Bus Corporation
Pictures of Dublin Bus's VT class, the Enviro500-bodied B9TL
Delaine buses website page detailing order and delivery of B9TL Olympus number 141

See also

Double-decker buses
B09TL
Low-floor buses
Open-top buses
Tri-axle buses
Bus chassis
Vehicles introduced in 2002